Gerrit Duijm (5 December 1888 – 30 July 1942) was a Dutch wrestler. He competed in the men's Greco-Roman middleweight at the 1908 Summer Olympics.

References

External links
 

1888 births
1942 deaths
Dutch male sport wrestlers
Olympic wrestlers of the Netherlands
Wrestlers at the 1908 Summer Olympics
Sportspeople from Rotterdam